Saikawa (written: 犀川, 斎川, 西川 or 斉川) is a Japanese surname. Notable people with the surname include:

, Japanese businessman, CEO of Nissan
, Japanese physician
, Japanese sport wrestler
, Japanese footballer

Japanese-language surnames